Jonathan "Jono" Macbeth (born 26 March 1973) is a former New Zealand professional yachtsman who has participated in 6 America's Cup campaigns.

Macbeth was born in Castor Bay, Auckland, New Zealand. He joined Team New Zealand in 1997 and remained with them for their 2003 and 2007 campaigns.

Macbeth joined the Sir Russell Coutts led American syndicate BMW Oracle Racing in 2008 and remained with them for their 2013 campaign.

Macbeth joined Sir Ben Ainslie's LandRover BAR team in 2014 for their 2017 campaign. Macbeth was released from LandRover BAR (renamed Ineos Team UK) in July 2019.

References

Living people
1973 births
Sportspeople from Auckland
New Zealand male sailors (sport)
America's Cup sailors